The Big Fall is a 1997 American neo-noir action-drama film directed by and starring C. Thomas Howell. It was released direct to video on October 14, 1997, having previously aired on HBO in April 1997.

Cast
 C. Thomas Howell as Blaise Rybeck
 Sophie Ward as Emma Roussell
 Jeff Kober as Johnny 'Axe' Roosevelt
 Sam Seder as Gary Snider
 Justin Lazard as Agent Bill Dickson
 Titus Welliver as Moe
 Buzz Belmondo as Brody
 Darren Dalton as Larry
 Joanne Baron as Mrs. Brody
 William Applegate Jr. as Agent Wilcox
 Steve DeRelian as Echo
 Kathy Griffin as Sally

Reception
In his review, Nathan Rabin of The A.V. Club wrote "The script doesn't do Howell any favors, with its wide selection of stock characters and predictable twist." However, he remarked that "Howell's direction is surprisingly competent." He also labelled Howell's lead role in the film as "unintentionally hilarious", claiming "The eternally boyish and effeminate former teen star can't help but inspire chuckles as he spits out supposedly witty tough-guy banter and gritty narration in a silly Bogart-esque mumble that needs to be heard to be believed."

References

External links
 
 

1997 films
1990s action drama films
American action drama films
American neo-noir films
Films directed by C. Thomas Howell
1997 drama films
1990s English-language films
1990s American films